The Visit is a 2000 American film written and directed by Jordan Walker-Pearlman, based on a play by Kosmond Russell.

Premise
Alex Waters (Hill Harper), a young man dying of AIDS, is serving 25 years in prison for a rape he says he didn't commit. Alex, his family and his girlfriend try to come to an emotional resolution.

Cast
Obba Babatundé as Tony Waters
Rae Dawn Chong as Felicia
Marla Gibbs as Lois Waters
Hill Harper as Alex
Phylicia Rashad as Dr. Coles
Billy Dee Williams as Henry

Reception

Critical response
On the review aggregator Rotten Tomatoes, the film holds an approval rating of 72% based on 32 reviews, with an average rating of 6.34/10. The website's critics consensus reads: "An earnest drama, The Visit gains much emotional power through its fine performances." Metacritic, which uses a weighted average, assigned the film a score of 60 out of 100, based on 16 critics, indicating "mixed or average reviews".

Awards
2000: Independent Spirit Awards: 4 Nom., including Best First Feature 
2000: National Board of Review: Freedom of Expression Award
2000: Chicago Film Festival: Nominated for Best Feature

References

External links 

American independent films
2000 films
2000 drama films
American drama films
2000s English-language films
2000 independent films
2000s American films